Parachordodes is a genus of worms belonging to the family Chordodidae.

The species of this genus are found in Europe and East Asia.

Several cases of human infections have been reported in South Korea, Japan.

Species:

Parachordodes arndti  
Parachordodes capitosulcatus  
Parachordodes ciferrii  
Parachordodes lestici Schmidt-Rhaesa A. (2019). FADA Nematomorpha: World checklist of freshwater Nematomorpha species (version Dec 2010). In: Species 2000 & ITIS Catalogue of Life, 2019 Annual Checklist (Roskov Y., Ower G., Orrell T., Nicolson D., Bailly N., Kirk P.M., Bourgoin T., DeWalt R.E., Decock W., Nieukerken E. van, Zarucchi J., Penev L., eds.). Digital resource at www.catalogueoflife.org/annual-checklist/2019. Species 2000: Naturalis, Leiden, the Netherlands. ISSN 2405-884X.Parachordodes megareolatus   Parachordodes okadai

References

Nematomorpha